Romanz was a South African pop/opera vocal quartet. They sung predominantly in Afrikaans and also in English. They won several prominent awards for their work. They disbanded in 2014. Adam Barnard died on 6 May 2022.

Members

Past Members: 
 André Venter (2008–2014) 
 Burgend Botha (2008–2014)
 Adam Barnard (2008–2014)
 Christopher Lee Viljoen (2012–2014)
 Louis Loock (2008–2012)

Discography

Studio albums
 My Hele Hart (2009)
 Bly Getrou (2009)
 Ek Sal Getuig (2010)
 'N Duisend Drome (2011)
 Hou Vas (2012)
 With All My Heart (2012)
 Lig Jou Stem Op (2013)

Live albums
  2010: Treffers Live (CD)
  2011: Ek Sal Getuig 'Live' CD

DVDs 
  2010: Treffers Live (DVD) 
  2011: Ek Sal Getuig 'Live' DVD

References

South African musical groups
Vocal quartets
Afrikaans-language singers
Musical groups established in 2008
South African pop music groups